Leon F. Czolgosz (May 5, 1873 – October 29, 1901) was an American laborer and anarchist who assassinated President William McKinley on September 6, 1901, in Buffalo, New York. The president died on September 14 after his wound became infected. Caught in the act, Czolgosz was tried, convicted, and executed by the State of New York seven weeks later on October 29, 1901.

While some American anarchists described his action as inevitable, motivated by what they saw as the country's brutal social conditions, others condemned Czolgosz for hindering the movement's goals by damaging its public perception.

Early life 
Leon F. Czolgosz was born in Detroit, Michigan, on May 5, 1873. He was one of eight children born to the Polish-American family of Paul (Paweł) Czolgosz (1843–1944) and his wife Mary (Maria) Nowak. The family moved to Alpena, Michigan in 1880. When Leon was 10, and the family was living in Posen, Michigan, Czolgosz's mother died six weeks after giving birth to his sister, Victoria. In 1889, the Czolgoszes moved to Natrona, Pennsylvania, where Leon worked at a glass factory. At age 17, they moved to Cleveland, Ohio, where he found employment at the Cleveland Rolling Mill Company. 

After the economic crash of 1893, when the mill closed for some time and tried to reduce wages, the workers went on strike. With great economic and social turmoil around him, Czolgosz found little comfort in the Catholic Church and other immigrant institutions; he sought others who shared his concerns regarding injustice. He joined a moderate working man's socialist club, the Knights of the Golden Eagle, and eventually a more radical socialist group known as the Sila Club, where he became interested in anarchism.

Interest in anarchism 

In 1898, after witnessing a series of similar strikes, many ending in violence, and perhaps ill from a respiratory disease, along with his brother Micheal coming back from the Philippines, Czolgosz went to live with his father, who had bought a  farm the year before in Warrensville, Ohio. He fixed boxes and machines on the farm and was constantly at odds with his stepmother. It was later said that throughout his life he had never shown any interest in friendship or romantic relationships, and was bullied during his childhood. According to Paul Czolgosz, the "F" did not stand for anything and that it was there because he "liked the extra initial".

Czolgosz became a recluse. He was impressed after hearing a speech by the anarchist Emma Goldman, whom he met for the first time at one of her lectures in Cleveland in May 1901. After the lecture, Czolgosz approached the speakers' platform and asked her for reading recommendations. On the afternoon of July 12, 1901, he visited her at the home of Abraham Isaak, publisher of the newspaper Free Society, in Chicago and introduced himself as Fred C. Nieman (nobody), but Goldman was on her way to the train station. He told her that he was disappointed in Cleveland's socialists, and Goldman quickly introduced him to anarchist friends who were at the train station.

She later wrote a piece in defense of Czolgosz, which portrays him and his history in a way at odds with other sources: "Who can tell how many times this American child has gloried in the celebration of the 4th of July, or on Decoration Day, when he faithfully honored the nation's dead? Who knows but what he, too, was willing to 'fight for his country and die for her liberty'".

In the weeks that followed, Czolgosz's social awkwardness, evasiveness, and blunt inquiries about secret societies around Isaak and another anarchist, Emil Schilling, resulted in the radical Free Society newspaper to issue a warning pertaining to him on September 1, reading:

Czolgosz believed there was a great injustice in American society, an inequality which allowed the wealthy to enrich themselves by exploiting the poor. He concluded that the reason for this was the structure of government. About this time, he learned of the assassination of a leader in Europe, King Umberto I of Italy, who had been shot dead by anarchist Gaetano Bresci on July 29, 1900. Bresci told the press that he had decided to take matters into his own hands for the sake of the common man.

New York City police lieutenant Joseph Petrosino believed that the same Italian-based anarchist group suspected of being responsible for King Umberto's death was targeting McKinley, but his warnings were ignored.

Assassination of President William McKinley 

On August 31, 1901, Czolgosz traveled to Buffalo, New York, the site of the Pan-American Exposition, where President McKinley would be speaking. He rented a room in Nowak's Hotel at 1078 Broadway.

On September 6, Czolgosz went to the exposition armed with a concealed .32-caliber Iver Johnson "Safety Automatic" revolver he had purchased four days earlier. He approached McKinley, who had been standing in a receiving line inside the Temple of Music, greeting the public for ten minutes. At 4:07 p.m., Czolgosz reached the front of the line. While McKinley extended his hand, Czolgosz slapped it aside and shot the President twice in the abdomen at point-blank range: the first bullet ricocheted off a coat button and lodged in McKinley's jacket; the other seriously wounded him in the stomach. McKinley's stomach wound was not lethal, but he died eight days later on September 14, 1901, of an infection that had spread from the wound.

James Parker, a man standing directly behind Czolgosz, struck the assassin in the neck and knocked the gun out of his hand; as McKinley slumped backward, members of the crowd began beating Czolgosz. "Go easy on him, boys", McKinley told the attackers. The police struggled to keep the angry crowd off Czolgosz. Czolgosz was taken to Buffalo's 13th Precinct house at 346 Austin Street and held in a cell until he was moved to police headquarters.

Trial and execution 

After McKinley's death, newly inaugurated President Theodore Roosevelt declared, "When compared with the suppression of anarchy, every other question sinks into insignificance."

On September 13, the day before McKinley succumbed to his wounds, Czolgosz was taken from the police headquarters, which were undergoing repairs, and transferred to the Erie County Women's Penitentiary temporarily. On September 16, he was brought to the Erie County Jail to be arraigned before County Judge Emery. After the arraignment, Czolgosz was transferred to Auburn Prison.

A grand jury indicted Czolgosz on September 16 with one count of first-degree murder. Throughout his incarceration, Czolgosz spoke freely with his guards, but he refused every interaction with Robert C. Titus and Loran L. Lewis, the prominent judges-turned-attorneys assigned to defend him, and with the expert psychiatrist sent to test his sanity.

The case was prosecuted by the Erie County District Attorney, Thomas Penney, and assistant D.A. Frederick Haller, whose performance was described as "flawless". Although Czolgosz answered that he was pleading "Guilty", presiding Judge Truman C. White overruled him and entered a "Not Guilty" plea on his behalf.

Czolgosz's trial began in the state courthouse in Buffalo on September 23, 1901, nine days after McKinley died. Prosecution testimony took two days and consisted principally of the doctors who treated McKinley and various eyewitnesses to the shooting. Lewis and his co-counsel called no witnesses, which Lewis in his closing argument attributed to Czolgosz's refusal to cooperate with them. In his 27-minute address to the jury, Lewis took pains to praise McKinley.

Scott Miller, author of The President and the Assassin, notes that the closing argument was more calculated to defend the attorney's "place in the community, rather than an effort to spare his client the electric chair".

Even had the jury believed the defense that Czolgosz was insane, by claiming that no sane man would have shot and killed the president in such a public and blatant manner, knowing he would be caught, there was still the legal definition of insanity to overcome. Under New York law, Czolgosz was legally insane only if he was unable to understand what he was doing. The jury was unconvinced of Czolgosz's insanity due to the directions given to them by Judge White; they voted to convict him after less than a half-hour of deliberations (a jury member later said it would have been sooner but they wanted to review the evidence before conviction). 

Czolgosz had two visits the night before his execution, one with two clergymen and another later in the night with his brother and brother-in-law. Even though Czolgosz refused Father Fudzinski and Father Hickey twice, Superintendent Collins permitted their visit and escorted them to his cell. The priests pleaded for 45 minutes for him to repent, but he refused and they left. His brother Waldeck and brother-in-law Frank Bandowski visited after the priests had left. His brother asked him "Who got you into this scrape?" to which Czolgosz responded "No one. Nobody had anything to do with it but me." His brother said it was unlike him and was not how he was raised. When asked by his brother if he wanted the priests to come back, Czolgosz said, "No, damn them. Don't send them here again. I don't want them," and "Don't you have any praying over me when I am dead. I don't want it. I don't want any of their damned religion." His father wrote a letter to his son the night before his execution, wishing him luck and informing him that he could no longer help him, and Leon had to "pay the price for his actions." Although after the trial Czolgosz and his attorneys were informed of his right to appeal the sentence, they chose not to after Czolgosz declined. Also, the attorneys knew that there were no grounds for appeal; the trial had been "quick, swift, and fair."

Czolgosz's last words were: "I shot the president because I thought it would help the working people and for the sake of the common people. I am not sorry for my crime. I am awfully sorry because I could not see my father." Czolgosz was electrocuted by three jolts, each of 1,800 volts, in Auburn Prison on October 29, 1901, forty-five days after McKinley's death. He was pronounced dead at 7:14 a.m. The state electrician (executioner) of Czolgosz was Edwin Davis.

Waldeck Czolgosz and Frank Bandowski attended the execution. When Waldeck asked the warden for his brother's body, to be taken for proper burial, he was informed that he "would never be able to take it away", and that crowds of people would mob him. 

Czolgosz was autopsied by John E. Gerin; his brain was autopsied by Edward Anthony Spitzka. The autopsy showed his teeth were normal but in poor condition; likewise the external genitals were normal, although scars were present, the result of chancroids. The autopsy showed the deceased was in good health; a death mask was made of his face. The body was buried on prison grounds following the autopsy. Prison authorities had planned to inter the body with quicklime to hasten its decomposition, but decided otherwise after testing quicklime on a sample of meat. After determining that they were not legally limited to the use of quicklime for the process, they poured sulfuric acid into Czolgosz's coffin so that his body would be completely disfigured. The warden estimated that the acid caused the body to disintegrate within 12 hours. His clothes and possessions were burned in the prison incinerator to discourage exhibitions of his life.

Legacy 

Emma Goldman was arrested on suspicion of being involved in the assassination, but was released due to insufficient evidence. She later incurred a great deal of negative publicity when she published "The Tragedy at Buffalo". In the article, she compared Czolgosz to Marcus Junius Brutus, the assassin of Julius Caesar, and called McKinley the "president of the money kings and trust magnates." Other anarchists and radicals were unwilling to support Goldman's effort to aid Czolgosz, believing that he had harmed the movement.

The scene of the crime, the Temple of Music, was demolished in November 1901, along with the rest of the Exposition's temporary structures. A stone marker in the median of Fordham Drive, now a residential street in Buffalo, marks the approximate spot where the shooting occurred. Czolgosz's revolver is on display in the Pan-American Exposition exhibit at the Buffalo History Museum in Buffalo.

After Czolgosz's death, Lloyd Vernon Briggs (1863–1941), a Boston alienist who later became the Director of the Massachusetts Department for Mental Hygiene, reviewed the Czolgosz case in 1901 on behalf of psychiatrist Dr. Walter Channing (1849–1921), concluding Czolgosz was insane; that conclusion has since been challenged.

Czolgosz is buried at Soule Cemetery in Cayuga County, New York. His grave is unmarked, with a stone reading "Fort Hill Remains".

Portrayals in media 
Czolgosz's execution was portrayed in the 1901 silent film Execution of Czolgosz with Panorama of Auburn Prison.
He is featured as a central character of Stephen Sondheim's musical Assassins. His assassination of McKinley takes place during a musical number called "The Ballad of Czolgosz".
He was portrayed in the Reaper episode "Leon" by Patton Oswalt, as an escaped/captured/released/re-captured soul from Hell who could turn his arms into large guns, but had issues with his father.
In season 7, episode 15, of the CBC television drama series Murdoch Mysteries, "The Spy Who Came Up to the Cold" (2014), Leon Czolgosz is portrayed by Goran Stjepanovic.

See also 
 List of assassinations
 John Wilkes Booth, assassin of President Abraham Lincoln
 Charles Guiteau, assassin of President James Garfield
 Lee Harvey Oswald, assassin of President John Kennedy

Notes

References

Citations

Cited sources 

 
 
 
 
  a review of The World That Never Was: A True Story of Dreamers, Schemers, Anarchists, and Secret Agents, by Alex Butterworth, Pantheon Books.

Further reading

External links 

 Leon Czolgosz Signed Confession to the Assassination of President McKinley Shapell Manuscript Foundation
 Film: Execution of Czolgosz, with panorama of Auburn Prison (1901 reenactment), Library of Congress archives
 PBS biography of Czolgosz
 Leon Czolgosz – Mr. "Nobody": Original Letter

1873 births
1901 deaths
1901 murders in the United States
19th-century American people
20th-century executions by New York (state)
20th-century American criminals
20th-century executions of American people
American anarchists
American assassins
American male criminals
American people executed for murder
American people of Belarusian descent
American people of Polish descent
American revolutionaries
Anarchist assassins
Assassination of William McKinley
Assassins of presidents of the United States
Executed anarchists
Executed assassins
Executed people from Michigan
History of Buffalo, New York
History of Cleveland
Illegalists
People convicted of murder by New York (state)
People executed by New York (state) by electric chair
People from Alpena, Michigan
Burials in New York (state)